Latham is an unincorporated community in Moniteau County, Missouri, United States. It is located six miles southwest of California.

Latham was laid out in 1880. The community has the name of Judge Gardiner Latham, a first settler. A post office called Latham has been in operation since 1892.

Demographics

References

Unincorporated communities in Moniteau County, Missouri
Jefferson City metropolitan area
Unincorporated communities in Missouri